East of West is a monthly comic book series published by Image Comics which debuted in March 2013 and was concluded in December 2019. Created by writer Jonathan Hickman and artist Nick Dragotta, the book is a science fiction Western set in a dystopian version of the United States whose fate rests with the Four Horsemen of the Apocalypse.

Publication history
At the 2012 New York Comic Con, Image Comics announced East of West as one of the publisher's new titles in 2013. 
The series reunited writer Jonathan Hickman and illustrator Nick Dragotta, who had previously collaborated on Fantastic Four for Marvel Comics. In an interview with Comic Book Resources, Dragotta recalled: "I remember a few email exchanges where we said we should work together again sometime, maybe do a creator-owned book. That was kind of it. It gestated for a little while when we worked on FF and our relationship grew tighter. We met at the last Image Expo and sat down for lunch. He told me he had this great idea for a Western, and I said I wanted to draw science fiction. We merged it into a sci-fi Western, and that's how the idea was born." 
The first issue of East of West was released on March 27, 2013.

Premise
Hickman told Previews catalogue that the tagline of East of West is "The things that divide us are stronger than the things that unite us." Hickman explained, "The end times are imminent and we all hate each other too much to come together and solve our problems. Our final destination is imminent, and it is the Apocalypse. And then, in the face of all that despair and gloom, somehow there is still hope." 
The series, a science-fiction Western set in a dystopian America, casts the Four Horsemen of the Apocalypse as heroes. Of these four characters, Hickman describes Death - a "Clint Eastwood-y" man wearing a suit, cowboy hat and skull bolo tie - as someone who feels "betrayed", and the others (War, Famine and Conquest) as feeling "abandoned". 
The second arc, according to Dragotta, focuses on the Chosen, "a group of elites from the Seven Nations who are working to bring about the end of the world."

Plot
Set in the dystopian 2064 United States, the series explores an alternate timeline where in the past, the Civil War never ended and an extended war continued until a comet hits present-day Kansas in 1908. The six warring parties met at Armistice-the site of the comet's impact-and made a truce. This resulted in the signing of the treaty forming "the Seven Nations of America": the Armistice, The Union, The Confederacy, the Kingdom of New Orleans, the Endless Nation, the Republic of Texas, and the People's Republic of America. On the day of the treaty signing, Elijah Longstreet, a Confederate Army soldier under Stonewall Jackson, and Red Cloud, the chief of chiefs to the Native American tribes of the Endless Nation, simultaneously prophesied what would later become part of The Message. Both immediately collapsed and died after delivering their respective prophecies.

In 1958, Chairman Mao Zedong of the PRA wrote the addendum to his Little Red Book; this addendum was the third piece of the prophecy meant to complete The Message, which foretold the Apocalypse.

Since then, The Four Horsemen of the Apocalypse (Death, War, Famine, and Conquest) physically manifest and seeks to fulfill the prophecies. Believers of the Message periodically make pilgrimages to the Armistice, only to be slaughtered by the Horsemen on the way. Conquest decided to adopt one of the pilgrim's orphans, named him Ezra Orion, then raised and trained him to be the Keeper of the Message. A structure over Armistice was built to prevent any pilgrimages. Ezra became the first of "the Chosen", a group whose later members are Believers and high-ranking officials representing each Nation. The Chosen members are assigned to help bring about the Apocalypse.

On their path to the Apocalypse, the Horsemen got derailed when Death falls in love with Xiaolian, a daughter of Mao V. In 2054, she and Death had a son together; this urges Death to abandon the Horsemen and their mission. However, this coupling was envisioned by the prophecy, with their son being interpreted as "the Beast of the Apocalypse". Hu, Xiaolian's sister and a member of the Chosen, betrays her sister to the remaining Horsemen. Xiaiolian's son was taken away, and she was kept prisoner by her father, who struck a deal with the three Horsemen to hide Xiaolian from Death. Death's son was kept in a secret facility, where Ezra began raising him to become the Beast.

Death was informed of his family's death by the Horsemen; enraged, he kills them. The Chosen then injured and left Death to die. Death, however, survives due to the intervention of two Endless Nation witches, Crow and Wolf. A decade later, War, Famine, and Conquest are resurrected at Armistice as 10-year-old children when they realize Death's absence. Feeling betrayed, they determine to accomplish their mission without him. Death, on the other hand, seeks revenge on The Chosen for the presumed death of his wife and son. Here begins the story of East of West #1.

Characters

Pro-Apocalypse:

 War, Famine, Conquest- The three Horsemen of the Apocalypse who committed to bring about the End of Days.  Each of the Horsemen has different colored skin: War is red, Famine is yellow, and Conquest is blue. In their current incarnation, War and Conquest are male children while Famine is a female child; however, in their previous incarnation, War and Conquest were adult females while Famine was an adult male.
 Ezra Orion (Chosen)- The fanatic Premier of Armistice and Keeper of the Message. Ezra is the adopted son of Conquest and seeks to please his mother by becoming "what the Message demands". He would later eat the prophecy and becomes the Living Word. After an incident, he fuses with a demon he later named Buer. He is eventually consumed by Wolf.
 Madame President Antonia LeVay (Chosen)- The arrogant President of the Union. Formerly the Secretary of the Interior, she assumed the mantle after Death killed the previous President and the three Horsemen killed all seven of her predecessors in the line of succession. As she was a believer in the Message, the Horsemen arranged for her to take the office of President. She is later killed in a rebel attack on Washington, D.C., orchestrated by President Chamberlain.
 John Freeman I (Chosen)- The skillful yet impulsive Crown Prince of the Kingdom of New Orleans. His father, King John Freeman, appointed Cheveyo as his teacher/mentor; through Cheveyo, John was initiated into the belief system of the Chosen. He has 14 brothers, all named John Freeman and vying to replace him as Crown Prince. The Ranger attempts to assassinate him, but he is saved by his lover, the Vizier, and escapes to join Wolf.
 Cheveyo (Chosen)- An outcast shaman of the Endless Nation. He is Wolf's father as well as John Freeman's mentor. He provided the Endless Nation's technology to the Chosen so that they could create the Beast of the Apocalypse. He was killed by the Ranger while being interrogated by Death, after which he uses Bel Solomon as his living host.
 Hu (Chosen)- A daughter of Mao V and sister to Xiaolian. As a believer in the Message, Hu turned her sister over to the Chosen so that they could take Xiaolian's son and cultivate him into the Beast of the Apocalypse. She was killed by Xiaolian soon after Death returned to the PRA.  
 Balloon- Mobile AI provided by Cheveyo to the Chosen. Balloon's entire purpose is to influence Babylon into becoming the Beast of the Apocalypse.

Anti-Apocalypse:

 Death (Horseman of the Apocalypse)- The protagonist of the series. Formerly of the Four Horsemen of the Apocalypse, Death fell in love with Xiaolian and fathered a son with her.  Presumedly killed by Bel Solomon of The Chosen, he survived with the help of Wolf and Crow. Since then, the white Horsemen embark on a quest for revenge over his wife and son.
 Crow- A witch, Wolf's lover, and an accomplice of Death from the Undying Lands of the Endless Nation. She has the ability to shapeshift into crows. 
 Wolf- A witch, Crow's suitor, and an accomplice of Death from the Waking World of the Endless Nation. Wolf, Cheveyo's son, and John Freeman I consider themselves to be brothers as they are raised together. He later becomes the Living Word after consuming Ezra Orion and then succeeds his uncle Narsimha as Chief of the Endless Indian Nation. He has the ability to shapeshift into wolves.  
 Governor Bel Solomon (Chosen)- Governor of the Republic of Texas. Bel was formerly a just lawyer; he helped the Ranger in seeking justice for the murder of his family. However, he gradually allowed himself to become an accomplice of the Chosen. Eventually, he regretted joining and aiding the Chosen and sought to rebel; but was betrayed by Archibald, who also captures him after he escapes from Endless custody. He is currently possessed by Cheveyo.
 Mao Xiaolian- Death's wife, Babylon's mother, and current Premier of the PRA who rose to power after committing regicide against Mao V, her father. Xiaolian was imprisoned in her father's garden for 10 years, believing that her son had died. 
 The Ranger- A Texan vigilante aiming to eliminate all of the Chosen. The Ranger and his partners led a rebellion against Texas' corrupt system after he failed to gain justice over his family's murder. Initially retired, he stepped back into his role after Bel Solomon tipped him off about the Chosen's plans. He was accompanied by his robot dog Red until Chamberlain shot it.

Independent Allegiances:

 President Archibald Chamberlain (Chosen)-  The cunning President of Confederacy and former Chief of Staff of Confederacy who assumed the mantle after assassinating the former president. An intelligent and skilled diplomat in leverage and negotiation, Archibald has proven to be a very conniving and slippery character. One of the best gunslingers in the West, Chamberlain proved himself as an arrogant and determined person willing to sacrifice anything for his personal gain. He is eventually killed by the Ranger. 
 Babylon- The highly-intelligent Son of Death and Xiaolian. Kidnapped from his parents and trapped in an AI virtual-reality from infancy, Babylon is being raised/brainwashed to become the Beast of the Apocalypse.
 The Oracle- The blind and imprisoned keeper of secrets. Her eyes were removed from her; one is in The Hunter's possession and the other in Chamberlain's. In exchange for giving Death information about his son's whereabouts, Oracle took both of Death's eyes to revive herself.
 The Hunter- A hired agent who assisted the Chosen and the Horsemen in hunting down Death. After becoming a bounty hunter contractor fronting as the bartender of The Atlas, he was forced by Death to give a list of the Chosen. He then gives away Death's location to the other Horsemen. He is later killed by Death after caught sending bounties to kill Babylon.

Reception
The first issue of East of West sold out in the week of its release. 
Newsarama's David Pepose wrote that knowing where the story is going "can be a challenge", but that "with sharp art and strong dialogue, this first issue has a lot going for it". 
Greg McElhatton of Comic Book Resources said, "Hickman and Dragotta are clearly telling an epic story, and it feels so rich and textured that it's hard to not want to see more. The comic is off to an extremely strong start". 
Reviews of the first five issues by IGN have received ratings ranging from 7.0 to 9.0 out of 10. 
J.C. Maçek III of PopMatters said after reading issue #2, "there is enough potential in both substance and style to give East of West a shot… with both barrels." 
In a review of the fifth issue, The A.V. Club's Oliver Sava said, "this conclusion to the first arc solidifies the emotional stakes of the story while setting a clear path for the future." McElhatton wrote that the eighth issue " is another strong installment in a series that deserves even more attention than it's already received." 
The first trade paperback collection, The Promise, topped the Diamond Comic Distributors sales charts in September.
It was chosen as one of Digital Spy's top ten comics of 2013.

Accolades and nominations

TV series
On April 19, 2018, it was announced that Amazon Studios, Skybound Entertainment, and Hickman would be developing an hour long series based on the property (along with "Transhuman").

At SDCC in 2019 Hickman revealed East of West is no longer in development at Amazon Prime Video.

Collected editions

References

External links
 at Image Comics
Talking Comics with Tim: Nick Dragotta on ‘East of West’  (August 12, 2013) at Comic Book Resources

2013 comics debuts
Comics by Jonathan Hickman
Image Comics titles
Post-apocalyptic comics
Science fiction comics
Western (genre) comics
Cultural depictions of Mao Zedong
Four Horsemen of the Apocalypse in popular culture
American Civil War alternate histories